The 1969 American Football League season was the tenth and final regular season of the AFL. To honor the AFL's tenth season, a special anniversary logo was designed and each Kansas City Chiefs player wore a patch on his jersey with the logo during Super Bowl IV, the final AFL-NFL World Championship Game prior to the AFL–NFL merger.

The Chiefs defeated the Oakland Raiders in the final AFL Championship Game, then soundly defeated the National Football League's Minnesota Vikings in Super Bowl IV.

Division races
In its final two years of existence the AFL had ten teams, grouped into two divisions.  Each team played a home-and-away game against the other four teams in its division, a home-and-away series against one of the five teams in opposite division, and one game each against the remaining four teams from the opposite division.  Using that format, the defending World Champion New York Jets went 10–0 against the five teams they played twice, but were 0–4 against the top four teams in the West.

For the 1969 season, a provision was made for a four team playoff to determine the AFL champion, the league's representative in the Super Bowl, with the #1 team in the division hosting the #2 team in the opposite division.

The 1970 merger placed the ten AFL teams (along with three teams from the pre-1970 NFL) into the 13-team AFC. The other NFL teams went into the 13-team NFC.

Regular season

Results

Standings
For its tenth and final season before merging with the NFL, the AFL instituted a four team playoff tournament with the second place teams in each division also participating.

Playoffs

Super Bowl

The Kansas City Chiefs defeated the Minnesota Vikings 23–7 at Tulane Stadium in New Orleans, Louisiana, on January 11, 1970.

Stadium changes
 After six seasons at Fenway Park, the Boston Patriots moved to Alumni Stadium at Boston College in 1969.

Coaching changes

Offseason
Boston Patriots: Mike Holovak was fired and replaced by Clive Rush.
Buffalo Bills: John Rauch became the new Bills head coach after resigning from the Oakland Raiders. Joe Collier was fired after two games into the 1968 season, and defensive coordinator Harvey Johnson then served as interim head coach.
Oakland Raiders: John Madden replaced John Rauch, who resigned to join the Bills.

In-season
San Diego Chargers: Sid Gillman sat out five games due to health issues. Charlie Waller, the team's offensive backfield coach, served as interim.

External links
Football Database

 
American Football League seasons